Erich Fak (born 10 March 1945) is an Austrian former international footballer.

References

External links

1945 births
Living people
Association football defenders
Austrian footballers
Austria international footballers
SK Rapid Wien players
FC Kärnten players